Terebra consobrina is a species of sea snail, a marine gastropod mollusc in the family Terebridae, the auger snails.

Description
The size of an adult shell varies between 70 mm and 135 mm.

Distribution
This species occurs in the Red Sea and in the Indian Ocean off Madagascar and Mauritius.

References

 Terryn Y. (2007). Terebridae: A Collectors Guide. Conchbooks & NaturalArt. 59pp + plates

External links
 
 Deshayes, G. P. (1857). Description d'espèces nouvelles du genre Terebra. Journal de Conchyliologie. 6 (1): 65-102.
 Fedosov, A. E.; Malcolm, G.; Terryn, Y.; Gorson, J.; Modica, M. V.; Holford, M.; Puillandre, N. (2020). Phylogenetic classification of the family Terebridae (Neogastropoda: Conoidea). Journal of Molluscan Studies. 85(4): 359-388

Terebridae
Gastropods described in 1857